Ferenc Laczó (born 1982 in Budapest) is a historian at Maastricht University.

Works

Magyarország Globális Története (1869-2022) ed. Ferenc Laczó and Bálint Varga (2022)

References

1982 births
Writers from Budapest
Academic staff of Maastricht University
Living people
21st-century Hungarian historians